Loch Drunkie is a small freshwater loch in the Trossachs near Aberfoyle in the Stirling council area, Scotland.

Geography
This picturesque and irregular Highland loch is shut on all sides by high hills.

Fishing 
Since the 19th century, the loch has been well-known for containing a good stock of pike and brown trout. The fishing season lasts now from mid-March to the beginning of October.

References

Lochs of Stirling (council area)
Protected areas of Stirling (council area)
LDrunkie
Trossachs
Freshwater lochs of Scotland